The TOLIMAN (Telescope for Orbit Locus Interferometric Monitoring of our Astronomical Neighbourhood) space telescope is a low-cost mission concept aimed at detecting of exoplanets via the astrometry method, and specifically targeting the Alpha Centauri system. TOLIMAN will focus on stars within 10 parsecs of the Sun. The telescope, still under construction, is expected to be launched into low-earth orbit in 2023. The mission will involve scientists of the University of Sydney, Saber Astronautics in Australia, Breakthrough Initiatives, and NASA's Jet Propulsion Laboratory.

References

External links
About the project at Breakthrough Initiatives

Exoplanet search projects
Proposed NASA space probes
Space astrometry missions
Space telescopes